John Miller (born 1960) is a former linebacker in the National Football League. He was a member of the Green Bay Packers during the 1987 NFL season.

Professional career

Baltimore Colts
Miller signed with the Baltimore Colts of the National Football League on May 25, 1983, but was released on August 4, 1983.

New Jersey Generals
Miller signed with the New Jersey Generals of the United States Football League on November 29, 1983. He played for the Generals during their 1984 and 1985 seasons.

Green Bay Packers
Miller played in one game for the Green Bay Packers during the 1987 season.

References

Living people
1960 births
People from Oberlin, Ohio
Green Bay Packers players
New Jersey Generals players
American football linebackers
Mississippi State Bulldogs football players